Calodema annae is a species of beetle in the family Buprestidae. It was described by Grasso in 2020

Systematics 
 Buprestidae Leach, 1815
 Buprestinae Leach, 1815
 Stigmoderini Lacordaire, 1857
 Calodema Gory & Laporte de Castelnau, 1838

Synonyms 
Calodema antonkozlovi Pineda & Curletti, 2020: 75-79

Distribution 
Calodema annae is known from Indonesia, Arfak Mountains and Weyland Mountains.

Etymology 
The species is named in honour of the Australian entomologist Jennifer Anne Gardner.

References 

Buprestidae
Beetles described in 2020